Minneula Azizov (born June 23, 1951) is a retired field hockey player from Russia, who won the bronze medal with the Men's National Field Hockey Team from the Soviet Union at the 1980 Summer Olympics in Moscow.

References

External links
 

1951 births
Field hockey players at the 1980 Summer Olympics
Living people
Olympic bronze medalists for the Soviet Union
Olympic field hockey players of the Soviet Union
Soviet male field hockey players
Russian male field hockey players
Olympic medalists in field hockey
Medalists at the 1980 Summer Olympics